Melville is a suburb in southern Hamilton in New Zealand. It is named after James Dougal Melville. Many of the streets in Melville are named after war heroes, including Douglas Bader, Bernard Montgomery, Odette Hallowes, David Beatty and William Slim. 

Melville lends its name to one of Hamilton's top association football teams, Melville United who compete in the Lotto Sport Italia NRFL Premier.

It borders the suburbs of Glenview and Fitzroy.

History 
Melville was named after the districts pioneer J Melville who lived in 1904 opposite the site of Melville Primary School. The Hospital paved the way for a great deal of development throughout the Melville area. Opened in 1887 the area quickly became known as Hospital Hill although it was not added to the Hamilton Borough until 1936. Hamilton city extended its boundaries to Collins Road, Melville in 1954 and again in 1962 to Houchens Road, Glenview and Dixon Road, Glenview. In 1960 Melville gained Hamiltons 4th suburban post office which was followed in 1964 with the opening of Melville High School. The facilities in Melville reflected the significant growth of Melville / Glenview throughout the 1950s.

Melville was transferred from Waipa County to Hamilton City in 1949.

Pool 
The Gallagher Aquatic Centre is located in Melville.

Demographics

Melville had a population of 7,779 at the 2018 New Zealand census, an increase of 981 people (14.4%) since the 2013 census, and an increase of 1,233 people (18.8%) since the 2006 census. There were 2,646 households, comprising 3,774 males and 4,008 females, giving a sex ratio of 0.94 males per female, with 1,803 people (23.2%) aged under 15 years, 2,172 (27.9%) aged 15 to 29, 3,168 (40.7%) aged 30 to 64, and 633 (8.1%) aged 65 or older.

Ethnicities were 49.8% European/Pākehā, 35.8% Māori, 8.5% Pacific peoples, 22.1% Asian, and 2.6% other ethnicities. People may identify with more than one ethnicity.

The percentage of people born overseas was 27.3, compared with 27.1% nationally.

Although some people chose not to answer the census's question about religious affiliation, 43.2% had no religion, 38.5% were Christian, 2.1% had Māori religious beliefs, 3.4% were Hindu, 1.9% were Muslim, 1.4% were Buddhist and 3.4% had other religions.

Of those at least 15 years old, 1,350 (22.6%) people had a bachelor's or higher degree, and 1,077 (18.0%) people had no formal qualifications. 486 people (8.1%) earned over $70,000 compared to 17.2% nationally. The employment status of those at least 15 was that 3,072 (51.4%) people were employed full-time, 762 (12.8%) were part-time, and 402 (6.7%) were unemployed.

Education 
Melville High School is a secondary school serving years 9 to 13 with a roll of  students. It opened in 1964.

Melville Intermediate is a school for years 7 to 8 with a roll of  students. The school is adjacent to Melville High School.

Melville Primary School is a contributing primary school for years 1 to 6 with a roll of  students. It opened in 1924.

St Pius X School is a state-integrated Catholic full primary school for years 1 to 8 with a roll of  students. It was founded in 1958.

All these schools are coeducational. Rolls are as of

See also
 List of streets in Hamilton - Bader, Melville
Suburbs of Hamilton, New Zealand

References

Suburbs of Hamilton, New Zealand